Hum Dum is a 2005 Bollywood romantic-drama film directed by Kushan Nandy and produced by Kushan Nandy and Kiran Shroff under the banner of Sarvodaya Visuals. It features actors Romit Raj and Anjana Sukhani in the lead roles. Sujeet–Rajesh scored the music for the film.

Cast 

 Anjana Sukhani as Rutu Joshi
 Romit Raj as Siddhant Dey
 Tanvi Azmi
 Benjamin Gilani
 Ranvir Shorey
 Shammi
 Prithvi Zutshi
 Jaidev Hattangadi
 Om Katare

Music 

The soundtrack of the film has been given by Sujeet–Rajesh. Lyrics have been penned by Surendra Mishra and Shaheen Iqbal.

References

External links 
 
 

2005 films
2000s Hindi-language films